Éamonn Taaffe (born 18 February 1975) is an Irish retired hurler who played as a full-forward for the Clare senior team.

Born in Tubber, County Clare, Taaffe first played competitive hurling during his schooling at Our Lady's College. He arrived on the inter-county scene at the age of seventeen when he first linked up with the Clare minor team, before later joining the under-21 side. He joined the senior panel during the 1993-94 league. Taaffe was a regular member of the team for much of the rest of the decade and won one All-Ireland medal and one Munster medal.

At club level Taaffe played with Tubber

Throughout his career Taaffe made 8 championship appearances. He retired from inter-county hurling following the conclusion of the 2000 championship.

Playing career

Colleges

During his schooling at Our Lady's College in Gort, Taaffe established himself as a key member of the senior hurling team. In 1993 he a Connacht medal, a first provincial title for the school in almost a decade. St. Kieran's College provided the opposition in the subsequent All-Ireland decider. Taaffe's side were somewhat overawed by the occasion and were defeated by 3-15 to 1-10.

Club

Taaffe played both hurling and Gaelic football with Tubber and enjoyed some success during a lengthy career. After winning an under-16 championship medal he later added a senior B championship medal to his collection during the early stage of his club career.

Inter-county

Taaffe's underage career with the Clare minor and under-21 teams yielded little success.

During the 1993-94 league campaign Taaffe was added to the Clare senior panel by manager Len Gaynor. He played in a number of games but was best known as a player on the fringes of the team.

In 1995 a hamstring injury kept Taaffe off the starting fifteen, however, he collected a Munster medal as an unused substitute as Clare defeated reigning provincial champions Limerick by 1-17 to 0-11. On 3 September 1995 Clare faced reigning champions Offaly in the All-Ireland decider. Taaffe wasn't even named on the official list of substitutes but was introduced in the second half. After a long range speculative shot was sent towards the goalmouth Taaffe was at hand to send the sliotar to the net for the key goal for Clare. He was later substituted, however, Clare went on to win by 1-13 to 2-8 giving him an All-Ireland medal.

Taaffe remained on the bench for the next few years, only starting one championship match. He won a second set of Munster and All-Ireland medals in 1997 as Clare triumphed over Tipperary in both deciders.

In 1998 Taaffe won his first Munster medal on the field of play following a 2-16 to 0-10 defeat of Waterford in a tense provincial decider replay.

After leaving the panel in 1999, Taaffe returned the following year and made a few cameo appearances as a substitute. His late championship game was a 2-19 to 1-14 Munster semi-final defeat by Tipperary that year.

Honours

Player

Our Lady's College, Gort
Connacht Senior Colleges Hurling Championship (1): 1993

Clare
All-Ireland Senior Hurling Championship (2): 1995, 1997 (sub)
Munster Senior Hurling Championship (3): 1995 (sub), 1997 (sub), 1998

References

1975 births
Living people
Hurling forwards
Tubber hurlers
Clare inter-county hurlers
All-Ireland Senior Hurling Championship winners